Philip Dennis Hawkins FGRA is a British railway painter and photographer.

He was born in Birmingham, and became a railway illustrator. He was a founder of the Guild of Railway Artists and elected a Fellow in 1998.

Bibliography 

 Tracks on Canvas (1998) 
 Steam on Canvas (2005)

References

External links 
 Artist's website

British railway artists
20th-century British painters
British male painters
21st-century British painters
Year of birth missing (living people)
Living people
20th-century British male artists
21st-century British male artists